Stephen A. Werner (born 1956) is a college instructor and writer from St Louis.<ref>“About the Author” The Handy History Answer Book (Visible Ink Press, 2021).</ref>
Biography

Teaching
For over thirty years, Werner has taught as an adjunct instructor of the humanities at several universities in the St. Louis area. Along with courses on religion, theology, mythology, and history; he has taught courses on American culture covering such figures as Frank Sinatra and Elvis Presley. 

Based on his years of teaching religion he wrote How to Study Religion: A Guide for the Curious, an introduction to religion for college students or for those who are curious about religion.

Academic writing
	He wrote The Handy Christianity Answer Book: “an ideal ready reference … will interest young adults, general readers, Christians curious to learn more, and those who are spiritual but not religious and would like to explore the basics and some of the mysteries of the religion.”  He also wrote The Handy History Answer Book (4th ed.). Werner holds a Ph.D. in Historical Theology and his academic writing has focused on influential St. Louis Jesuits, such as Joseph Husslein, S.J. (1873-1952), a key figure in the development of American Catholic social thought in the early 1990s; Daniel A. Lord, S.J. (1888-1955), one of the most influential Catholic religious figures of the 20th century; and Dismas Clark, S.J. (1901-1963), who set up the first halfway house for men coming out of prison, and was portrayed in the 1961 movie The Hoodlum Priest.

In 2021, Werner published The Restless Flame, Daniel Lord, S.J.: Thinking Big a Parochial World, a comprehensive biography on this influential Jesuit.

Other writing
Werner's other writings include Life Hurts: An Exploration of the Pain and Suffering of Life and a humorous satire: Elvis and Apocalypse: The Awful Disclosures of Maria, Matron of the Hotel Dew Beanery  (Revised edition).

Theatrical writing
	He has also written and produced several theatrical works such as The Back Road to Bethlehem, a children’s Christmas musical; A Streetcar Named Ramona Junction; The Rum Luck of the Irish, a light-hearted farce set in St. Louis during prohibition; and Tobit’s Triumph a musical based on the biblical Book of Tobit. He wrote and composed an opera, Damn, You Gilgamesh! based on the ancient story The Epic of Gilgamesh''. Werner is also a composer. His song “Irish Farewell” is the most popular and is often performed at funerals around the world.

Academic articles
 “In Search of Stanley Kowalski” St. Louis Cultural History Project (Summer 2022).
 "Sixty Years Later, ‘Black Like Me’ is Still Relevant for the Catholic Church." America (December 29, 2021).
 “The Life, Social Thought, and Work of Joseph Caspar Husslein,” Annual Publication of the College Theology Society 38 (1992), “Religions of the Book.”
 “Joseph Husslein and the American Catholic Literary Revival: ‘A University in Print,’” Catholic Historical Review 87 (October 2001): 688-705.
 “Frank Sinatra and the Hoodlum Priest,” American Catholic Studies 129 (Winter 2016): 101-106.
 “Daniel A. Lord, SJ: A Forgotten Catholic Dynamo of the Early Twentieth Century,” American Catholic Studies 129 (Summer 2018): 39-58.
"The tragedy of Joyce Kilmer, the Catholic poet killed in World War I." America, 219, No. 2 (July 27, 2018).
 “‘The Birth of a Nation’ sparked decades of racial violence. This Jesuit understood its unholy power.” America, 224, No. 2 (February 19, 2021).
 “Daniel Lord, SJ, the Restless Flame: Supporting Catholic Families,” College Theology Society Annual Volume 66 (2020),48-58.
“Daniel Lord, S.J.: Booster for the American Nun,” St. Louis Cultural History Project (Spring 2022).
"Charles Arthur Floyd: The Pretty Boy in St. Louis," St. Louis Cultural History Project (Summer 2022).
“In Search of Stanley Kowalski,” St. Louis Cultural History Project (Summer 2022).

References

1956 births
Living people
Academics from Missouri
Writers from St. Louis